Cedar Hill is an unincorporated community in Surry County, North Carolina, United States, located near the town of Pilot Mountain.  Prominent landmarks include Cedar Hills Primitive Baptist Church.

Unincorporated communities in Surry County, North Carolina
Unincorporated communities in North Carolina